Beit Keshet (lit. House of the Bow) is a kibbutz in northern Israel. Located to the east of Nazareth, it falls under the jurisdiction of Lower Galilee Regional Council. It is located immediately opposite the Al-Tujjar Caravansarai.

Etymology

History

Beit Keshet was established in 1944 by HaNoar HaOved youth, who were trained at the Kfar Tavor agricultural school. During the founding of the kibbutz, a group of immigrants who were a part of the Youth movement HaMahanot HaOlim and graduates of the Kadoorie Agricultural High School joined the kibbutz. According to the Jewish National Fund, more than half of the original group had served with the Jewish forces during the Second World War.

By 1947, Beit Keshet had a population of over 100. During the 1948 Arab–Israeli war, Lebanese and Syrian troops attempted to capture Beit Keshet and nearby Sejera in fighting which the Jewish National Fund refers to as "fierce." 

On 16 March 1948, seven members of the kibbutz were killed during the battle of Beit Keshet. Among them was Eli, the son of Rachel Yanait and Yitzhak Ben-Zvi, the future second president of Israel. The story of the founding of the kibbutz and the battle is depicted in the theatre play An Israeli Love Story by Pnina Gary and in the 2017 film of the same name.

See also
List of forests in Israel

References

Kibbutzim
Kibbutz Movement
Populated places established in 1944
Jewish villages in Mandatory Palestine
Populated places in Northern District (Israel)
1944 establishments in Mandatory Palestine